Thomastik-Infeld is an Austrian company founded in 1919, located in Vienna developing and producing strings and rosins for bowed and fretted string instruments, including the violin, viola, cello, contrabass, and guitar.

The company still makes "Dominant" strings, one of the earliest brands of perlon string, now considered a standard for comparison to other synthetic string sets. Other string brands from the company include:
 Vision
 Spirocore
 Versum
 Superflexible
 Belcanto
 Infeld (Red and Blue)
 Prazision
 Alphayue
 Peter Infeld
 Dominant Pro
Many famous violinists, including Itzhak Perlman, Hilary Hahn, and Isaac Stern, have used Thomastik-Infield strings at some point in their career.

History 
In 1919, Dr. Franz Thomastik, a violin maker, and Otto Infeld, a civil engineer, decided to found a company. They started manufacturing steel strings.

Thomastik-Infeld's workshops were completely destroyed in World War Two.

In 1970, the Dominant strings were launched. In those years, the conventional gut string was challenged by perlon strings; Thomastik-Infeld offered this type of string, making the brand very popular for virtuosi across the world.

The company was run by Peter Infeld from 1994 until his death on April 15, 2009. He was 67 years old. The company is now run by Zdenka Infeld.

In 2019, Thomastik-Infield celebrated its 100 year anniversary by launching https://www.stringtelligence.com/.

In 2021, the Dominant Pro strings were launched.

References

External links
 Thomastik-Infeld
 Connolly Music Company - Exclusive US importers of Thomastik-Infeld strings
 Synwin Music - Exclusive Distributor of Thomastik-Infeld strings in Singapore

Music equipment manufacturers
Manufacturing companies based in Vienna